John Maurice Fluke, Sr. (14 December 1911 – 11 February 1984) was the founder of Fluke Corporation and the former General Electric employee, a manufacturer of electronic test equipment.   Fluke served as an officer in the United States Navy in World War II and worked on shipboard electrical problems for then-Captain Hyman G. Rickover.  He received the Legion of Merit for this work. He reached the rank of Commander before leaving the Navy at the war's end.

References

1911 births
1984 deaths
American electrical engineers
United States Navy officers
Recipients of the Legion of Merit
20th-century American businesspeople
20th-century American engineers
United States Navy personnel of World War II